Allochrostes saliata is a species of moth in the family Geometridae. It is native to the Afrotropics, and has been recorded in Kenya, Zambia and South Africa.

References

Geometrinae
Moths described in 1975
Moths of Africa